Drimycarpus is a small genus of trees in the cashew and sumac family Anacardiaceae. The generic name is from the Greek meaning "pungent fruit".

Distribution and habitat
Drimycarpus species grow naturally in tropical Asia from India to Borneo. Their habitat is forests from sea-level to  altitude.

Species
The Plant List and Catalogue of Life recognise about 4 accepted species:
 Drimycarpus anacardifolius 
 Drimycarpus luridus 
 Drimycarpus maximus 
 Drimycarpus racemosus

References

Anacardiaceae
Anacardiaceae genera
Taxa named by Joseph Dalton Hooker